Lawsonia may refer to:
 Lawsonia (plant), a genus of plants in the family Lythraceae
 Lawsonia (beetle), a genus of beetle in the family Anthribidae
 Lawsonia (bacterium), a genus of bacteria in the order Desulfovibrionales

 Lawsonia, Maryland, a town in Maryland
 Lawsonia, a golf course in Wisconsin